John Preston O'Donoghue (born May 26, 1969) is a former Major League Baseball (MLB) pitcher.

O'Donoghue made his major league debut on June 27, 1993 at Oriole Park at Camden Yards. He was the starting pitcher that day against the New York Yankees and he gave up 6 earned runs in 6.2 innings, including home runs by Mike Stanley, Jim Leyritz, and Bernie Williams, as Baltimore lost 9-5. His next 10 appearances were as a relief pitcher and he did much better, giving up just 4 earned runs in 13 innings.

Season and career totals include 11 games pitched, a 0-1 record, 3 games finished, 16 strikeouts and 10 walks in 19.2 innings pitched, and an earned run average of 4.58. O'Donoghue was traded to the Los Angeles Dodgers on December 19, 1994 but never again reached the big league level.

O'Donoghue is the son of former major league pitcher John Eugene O'Donoghue.

See also

 List of second-generation Major League Baseball players

External links
, or Retrosheet

1969 births
Living people
Major League Baseball pitchers
Baltimore Orioles players
Hagerstown Suns players
Baseball players from Wilmington, Delaware
Albuquerque Dukes players
Bluefield Orioles players
Bowie Baysox players
Frederick Keys players
Rochester Red Wings players
Tulsa Drillers players